56th Golden Horse Awards took place on November 23, 2019 at the Sun Yat-sen Memorial Hall in Taipei, Taiwan. Organized by the Taipei Golden Horse Film Festival Executive Committee, the awards honored the best in Chinese-language films of 2018 and 2019. The ceremony was televised by TTV.

Winners and nominees

In the news
Following a boycott by China's national film governing board National Radio and Television Administration due to political tensions between Taiwan and China, films from Mainland China were completely absent from the list of nominees. Hong Kong director Johnnie To, who was announced as the jury president for the 56th Golden Horse Awards in June 2019, resigned his position in late September after Hong Kong film studios were reportedly pressured to withdraw from the awards ceremony; To cited his reason as having "previously signed film production contractual obligations". Following the announcement of the Chinese boycott, some production companies in Hong Kong also pulled films from consideration at the award ceremony. Despite this, there were a number of Hong Kong titles in the awards running which include Suk Suk, My Prince Edward and documentary Bamboo Theatre. Maserati announced on Sina Weibo in October 2019 that it had ended sponsorship of the Golden Horse Awards, stating in part, "Maserati always respects China's territorial integrity, history and culture, and firmly upholds the one-China principle."

References

External links
 Official website of the Golden Horse Awards

56th
2019 film awards
2019 in Taiwan